The year 1647 in science and technology involved some significant events.

Astronomy
 Johannes Hevelius publishes the first comparatively detailed map of the Moon in his Selenographia (Danzig).

Births
 January 17 – Elisabeth Hevelius, Danzig astronomer (died 1693)
 March 20 – Jean de Hautefeuille, French inventor (died 1724)
 April 2 – Maria Sybilla Merian, German lepidopterist (died 1717)
 August 22 – Denis Papin, French physicist (died c. 1712)
 December 7 – Giovanni Ceva, Italian mathematician (died 1734)

Deaths
 March 29 – Charles Butler, English beekeeper (born 1560)
 October 8 – Christen Sørensen Longomontanus, Danish astronomer (born 1562)
 October 25 – Evangelista Torricelli, Italian physicist and mathematician (born 1608)

References

 
17th century in science
1640s in science